Akashvani may refer to:

 Akashvani (radio broadcaster), previously known as All India Radio
 Akashvani (word), a Sanskrit term commonly used in Hindu mythology

See also
 Akaash Vani, a 2013 Hindi romance film